Bosnia and Herzegovina literary heritage based on local language traditions and literacy can be assessed starting with the Middle Ages. The oldest preserved Bosnian inscriptions is considered to be the Humac tablet, inscribed into stone tablet between the 10th and 12th century, which means that probably predates Charter of Ban Kulin written on 29 August 1189. 

Going back to medieval period in history, literature was predominantly ecclesiastical, with literacy revolving around the Bosnian Church production, and other religious, diplomatic and trade texts, based on an old form of Shtokavian dialect,  Ijekavian dialect, Old Slavic, and usage of Bosnian Cyrillic and in lesser extent Glagolitic scripts. One specific peculiarity of this period in Bosnia and Herzegovina history are written monuments in form of stećaks.

Background

Such medieval writings, found in Bosnia and Herzegovina, produced during medieval period in Bosnian history, which included parts of Dalmatia, Old Herzegovina, revolve around liturgical literature production, such as Divoševo jevanđelje, Grškovićev odlomak Apostola, the Hrvoje's Missal, Hval's Codex (Hvalov zbornik, or Hvalov rukopis / Хвалов рукопис), Mletačka apokalipsa, Čajniče Gospel (Čajničko jevanđelje), belong to the Bosnian literature, and are considered the written heritage, but not a literature in the strict modern sense.
The manuscripts belonging to the Bosnian Church, are important part of the literary production during this period. Some of these manuscripts have some iconographic elements which are not in concordance with the supposed theological doctrine of the Christians, like the Annunciation, the Crucifixion and the Ascension. All of the important Bosnian Church books, such as Nikoljsko jevanđelje, Srećkovićevo jevanđelje, Hvalov zbornik, Radosavljeva bosanska knjiga (or Rukopis krstjanina Radosava, or Zbornik krstjanina Radosava), are based on Glagolitic Church books.

Body of work

Inscriptions
The Humac tablet is an Old Slavic epigraph in the form of a stone tablet, written in Bosnian Cyrillic script, and carved into a stone slab. It is thought to have originated between the 10th and 12th centuries, making it the oldest surviving Bosnian text, older even than Charter of Ban Kulin It is the oldest Cyrillic epigraph found in Bosnia and Herzegovina, and it was found in the village of Humac in Bosnia and Herzegovina.
The tablet was never precisely dated, but some attempts included Yugoslav and Bosnian epigrapher and medievalist, Marko Vego, who dated it to the end of the 10th or the beginning of the 11th century,  same dating suggested linguist Jovan Deretić, while historian Dimitrije Bogdanović dated it to the beginning of the 12th century.
The text of the tablet tells the story about the act of building a church by Krsmir (also rendered Uskrsimir or Krešimir) and his wife Pavica, which was dedicated to the Archangel Michael. The tablet is quadrangle in shape, 68x60x15 cm, and the inscription is carved in form of a quadrangle in Cyrillic script among which five Glagolitic letters can be identified, four E-like letters resembling Ⰵ and a Ⱅ letter alongside a conventional Cyrillic Т.
It was first noted by a French diplomat at the Bosnia Vilayet. Today, tablet is kept at the local museum of the Franciscan friary in the same village where it was found, namely Humac.

Ploča župana Grda is another inscribed stone tablet from Trebinje, today's Herzegovina. It was cut around 1180 as a gravestone tablet for Župan Grd, during the rule of the Grand Župan of Zeta, Mihajlo. The tablet is kept in the church in Police near Trebinje.

Ploča Kulina bana is the church inscription of Ban Kulin from around 1185, found near Visoko, and today kept in the National Museum of Bosnia and Herzegovina.

Kočerinska ploča (or Natpis Vignja Miloševića), is a medieval tablet with an inscription cut in 1404 or 1405 on the stone tablet placed on the stećak tombstone of Viganj Milošević, written in Bosnian Cyrillic, in an archaic West Stokavian dialect of Serbo-Croatian, using ikavian subdialect. It was discovered in 1983 in a necropolis of Lipovac, in village Kočerin, near Široki Brijeg, Bosnia and Herzegovina, where it is now exhibited in the parochial premises in Kočerin.
The tablet contains 25 rows of script, with 9-15 characters on each line. There are 300 characters in total and represents the largest known text in Bosnian Cyrillic, and displays a large number of ligatures. It is written in a Shtokavian Ikavian dialect, without nasal vowels, in a single-yer script, with some apparent Glagolitic influence. The form svetago shows influence from Church Slavonic, but the rest of the inscription is free of Church Slavonicisms in its morphology. 
The text says how Viganj Milošević served five Bosnian rulers, Banus Stjepan, King Tvrtko, King Dabiša, Queen Gruba, and King Ostoja, and ends with a message: .

Stećak inscriptions

Earliest stećak inscriptions could be traced back to 12th century medieval Bosnia.

Documents
Povelja Bana Kulina is the first diplomatic document written in the old Bosnian language and represents the oldest work written in the Bosnian Cyrillic script (Bosančica), one of the oldest written state documents in the region. It was written on 29 August 1189 as a trade agreement between the Banate of Bosnia and the Republic of Ragusa. According to the charter, Bosnian Ban Kulin promises to knez Krvaš and all the people of Dubrovnik full freedom of movement and trading across his country. The charter is written in two languages: Latin and an old form of Shtokavian dialect, with the Shtokavian part being a loose translation of the Latin original. The scribe was named as Radoje, and the script is Bosnian Cyrillic (Bosančica).
As such, it is of particular interest to both linguists and historians. Apart from the trinitarian invocation (U ime oca i sina i svetago duha), which characterizes all charters of the period, the language of the charter is completely free of Church Slavonic influence. The language of the charter reflects several important phonological changes that have occurred in Bosnian until the 12th century:
The Saint Petersburg copy is in the literature usually called "the original" (or copy A), and copies stored in the Dubrovnik Archive as "younger copy" (or copy B) and "older copy" (or copy C). At first it was thought that the Saint Petersburg copy, which was the first one to be published and studied, was the original and others were much younger copies (for example, Milan Rešetar dated the copies B and C into the latter half of the 13th century) but that was called into question by later analyses. According to a study by Josip Vrana, evidence that copy A represents the original remains inconclusive at best, and according to a comparative analysis that copy represents only a conceptual draft of the charter according to which the real original was written. Copies B and C are independent copies of the real original, which was different from the copy A.
Palaeographic analysis indicates that all three copies of the charter were written in approximately the same period at the turn of the 12th century, and that their scribes originate from the same milieu, representing the same scribal tradition. Their handwriting on the one hand relates to the contemporary Cyrillic monuments, and on the other hand it reflects an influence of the Western, Latin culture. Such cultural and literary opportunities have existed in the area which encompassed the Dubrovnik region at the period. Copy A probably, and copies B and C with certainty, originate from the scribe who lived and was educated in Dubrovnik and its surroundings.
Linguistic analysis however does not point to any specific characteristics of the Dubrovnikan speech, but it does show that the language of the charter has common traits with Ragusan documents from the first half of the 13th century, or those in which Ragusan scribal offices participated. Given that Ragusan delegates participated in the drafting of their copy, everything points that a scribe from Dubrovnik area must have participated in the formulation of the text of the copy A. However, that the final text was written at the court of Ban Kulin is proved by how the date was written: using odь rožьstva xristova, and not the typical first-half-of-the-13th-century Dubrovnikan lěto uplьšteniě.

Batalovo jevanđelje is dated to 1393. The gospel was written by the scribe (in medieval Bosnia called dijak) Stanko Kromirijanin. The tepčija Batalo Šantić was the scribe's patron. Four pages of the gospel are preserved, and are held in National Library of Russia in Saint Petersburg. On the third preserved page the scribe Stanko states that he was writing an ornate gospel for Batalo, dating its completion to 1393, during the reign of Dabiša. On page two, there is a list of djed of the Bosnian Church. Researchers call this list „Red gospodina Rastudija“ (Order of Bishop Rastudije), and is understood as a list of names of all Bosnian Church bishops before and after him.

Liturgical books
Hrvojev misal is liturgical book, written in Split by the resident calligrapher and glagolitic scribe Butko in 1404 for Hrvoje Vukčić Hrvatinić sometime around 1403-1404. Missal found its way to Istanbul and is currently kept at the Topkapı Palace Museum Manuscript Library. The knowledge of its existence was lost, until it was mentioned by linguists Vatroslav Jagic, L. Thallóczy and F. Wickhoff in the 19th Century. The book's location in the Topkapi Palace was determined by the art historian Mara Harisijadis in 1963. Once bound in precious covers, from 19th century Hrvoje's Missal is in leather binding, is considered as one of the most beautiful Glagolitic books. It contains 247 folios, which includes 96 miniatures and 380 initials and many more small initials. Some details are made of golden leaves. It is written in two columns on 488 pp (22.5x31 cm), and contains also some music notation. Some initials contain architectural elements of the Dalmatian city of Split. The peculiarity and particular value of the Hrvoje's Missal lies in its combination of eastern and western principles in terms of composition and contents, thus making it a truly invaluable work with a place in the regional and transregional history of art.

Čajniče Gospel is the oldest gospel written in medieval Bosnia at the end or the beginning of the 15th century, which probably belonged to the Bosnian noble family, the Pavlovićs, and is the only medieval Bosnian gospel that has been preserved in country to this day. Analyzing the language characteristics and its Ijekavian dialect, it is certain that it originate from ijekavijan eastern Bosnia. The codex was written in shorthand, with a semi-constitution of the Bosnian type, also known as Bosnian Cyrillic. It is estimated that five main scribes took turns, continuously writing the text. The Čajniče Gospel is a four-gospel, and only parts of the Gospel of Matthew, the Gospel of Mark, and most of the Gospel of Luke have been preserved, while the Gospel of John, the beginning and end of the manuscript, and a certain number of pages in the middle, are lost, so that in present condition the manuscript has 167 pages. The codex is declared a National monument of Bosnia and Herzegovina. The museum of the Church of the Assumption of the Blessed Mother of God, of the Čajniče Monastery, in Čajniče, Bosnia and Herzegovina, keeps the book

Divoš's Gospel

Three Bosnian apocalypses
Hvalov zbornik (Hvalov zbornik, or Hvalov rukopis / Хвалов рукопис) is a Bosnian Cyrillic manuscript of 353 pages, written in Split in 1404,, for Duke Hrvoje Vukčić Hrvatinić. It was illuminated by Gothic artists from the Dalmatian littoral.
It was written by krstjanin Hval in Bosnian Cyrillic in the Ikavian accent, with a Glagolitic alphabet introduction, and is decorated with miniatures and other artistic elements. The codex contains parts of the Bible, hymns and short theological texts, and it was copied from an original Glagolitic text, also evident from Glagolitic letters found in two places in the book. The codex is one of the most famous manuscripts belonging to the Bosnian Church, in which there are some iconographic elements which are not in concordance with the supposed theological doctrine of Christians (Annunciation, Crucifixion and Ascension). New analyses of style and painting techniques show that they were inscribed by at least two miniaturists. One painter was painting on the blue background, and the other was painting on the gold background in which the miniatures are situated in a rich architectonic frame. The codex is kept in the University Library in Bologna, Italy.

Radosavljeva bosanska knjiga (or Rukopis krstjanina Radosava, or Zbornik krstjanina Radosava) is the youngest, different in content and scarce in relation to the other two anthologies of medieval Bosnian literature - the Hval's from 1404 and the Venetian's from the beginning of the 15th. It consists of 60 sheets of paper, size 14, 3x11 cm. It was named after the scribe Radosav the Christian, who wrote it for Gojsav the Christian, during the reign of the Bosnian king Tomaš (1443-1461). The main content is the Apocalypse of John the Apostle. It's written in Bosnian Cyrillic, with the Glagolitic alphabet used in two places. It is decorated with two flags and a series of decorative initials. It is kept in the Vatican Library.

Mletačka Apokalipsa was written at the end of the 14th or the beginning of the 15th century. The exact dating has never been determined because interruptions and gaps the manuscript, with a missing the colophon, which probably existed, which means that both the writer or the patron remain unknown. Approximate dating is based on palaeographic and linguistic analysis of the manuscript. It very closely resembles to Hval's Codex in terms of language, but even more so in terms of individual chapters and their layout. The manuscript was first mentioned in 1719, and in 1794 it was already studied by Josef Dobrowsky, who described its contents. The manuscript is written more beautifully and legibly than Hval's, and the letters are slightly larger. It is kept in Venice in the Library of St. Mark.

See also
List of archives in Bosnia and Herzegovina
Gazi Husrev-beg Library
Vijećnica
Oriental Institute in Sarajevo
National and University Library of the Republika Srpska
National and University Library of Bosnia and Herzegovina
List of Glagolitic books

References

Sources
 
 
 
 
 
 
 
 
 

Fejzić, Fahira. "Povelja Kulina bana–međunarodna zakletva, diplomatsko-trgovinski ugovor i svjedok vremena." Godišnjak Bošnjačke zajednice kulture» Preporod « 1 (2009): 143-148.
Sivrić, Ivan. "Povelja Kulina bana Dubrovniku." Suvremena pitanja 6 (2008): 174-177.
Jalimam, Salih. "O latinskom tekstu u Povelji bana Kulina." Istrazivanja: Casopis Fakulteta Humanistickih Nauka 11 (2016).
Peco, Asim. "Povelja Kulina bana u svjetlosti štokavskih govora XII i XIII vijeka–u." Osamsto godina Povelje bosanskog bana Kulina, 1189-1989 (1989).
Vukomanović, S. "Leksika i gramatička značenja u Povelji Kulina bana, u: Osamsto godina Povelje bosanskog bana Kulina 1189–1989." Posebna izdanja ANUBiH, knj 23 (1989): 77-97.
Karavdić, Zenaida. "O Povelji Kulina bana–“Bez’v’sega z’loga primysla”."

External links